The thirteenth edition of the Johan Cruyff Shield was held on 23 August 2008 at the Amsterdam Arena. The match, which inaugurated the 2008–09 season in Dutch football, featured the 2007–08 Eredivisie champions PSV Eindhoven and 2007–08 KNVB Cup winners Feyenoord. PSV won 2–0.

Match details

References

 

2008
Joh
J
J
Johan Cruyff Shield